Garry Jones (born 1 May 1940) is an Australian former cyclist. He competed in three events at the 1960 Summer Olympics.

References

External links
 

1940 births
Living people
Australian male cyclists
Olympic cyclists of Australia
Cyclists at the 1960 Summer Olympics
Australian track cyclists
Place of birth missing (living people)
20th-century Australian people
21st-century Australian people